The Coahuiltecan were various small, autonomous bands of Native Americans who inhabited the Rio Grande valley in what is now southern Texas and northeastern Mexico. The various Coahuiltecan groups were hunter-gatherers. First encountered by Europeans in the sixteenth century, their population declined due to imported European diseases, slavery, and numerous small-scale wars fought against the Spanish, criollo, Apache, and other Coahuiltecan groups. 
After the Texas secession from Mexico, the Coahuiltecan culture was largely forced into harsh living conditions. It is because of these harsh influences that most people in the United States and Texas are not familiar with Coahuiltecan or Tejano culture outside of the main population groups mostly located in South Texas, West Texas, and San Antonio.

In 1886, ethnologist Albert Gatschet found the last known survivors of Coahuiltecan bands: 25 Comecrudo, 1 Cotoname, and 2 Pakawa. They were living near Reynosa, Mexico.

Brief overview

This name given to the Coahuiltecans is derived from Coahuila, the state in New Spain where they were first encountered by Europeans. This name was derived by the Spanish from a Nahuatl word.

The Coahuiltecan lived in the flat, brushy, dry country of southern Texas, roughly south of a line from the Gulf Coast at the mouth of the Guadalupe River to San Antonio and westward to around Del Rio. They lived on both sides of the Rio Grande. Their neighbors along the Texas coast were the Karankawa, and inland to their northeast were the Tonkawa. Both tribes were possibly related by language to some of the Coahuiltecan. To their north were the Jumano. Later the Lipan Apache and Comanche migrated into this area. Their indefinite western boundaries were the vicinity of Monclova, Coahuila, and Monterrey, Nuevo Leon, and southward to roughly the present location of Ciudad Victoria, Tamaulipas, the Sierra de Tamaulipas, and the Tropic of Cancer. People of similar hunting and gathering cultures lived throughout northeastern Mexico and southeastern Tejas, which included the Pastia, Payaya, Pampopa, and Anxau.
 
Although living near the Gulf of Mexico, most of the Coahuiltecan were inland people.  Near the Gulf for more than  both north and south of the Rio Grande, there is little fresh water. Bands thus were limited in their ability to survive near the coast, and were deprived of its other resources, such as fish and shellfish, which limited the opportunity to live near and employ coastal resources.

Language

In the mid-20th century, linguists theorized that the Coahuiltecan belonged to a single language family and that the Coahuiltecan languages were related to the Hokan languages of present-day California, Arizona, and Baja California. Most modern linguists, however, discount this theory for lack of evidence; instead, they believe that the Coahuiltecan were diverse in both culture and language. At least seven different languages are known to have been spoken, one of which is called Coahuiltecan or Pakawa, spoken by a number of bands near San Antonio. The best known of the languages are Comecrudo and Cotoname, both spoken by people in the delta of the Rio Grande and Pakawa. Catholic Missionaries compiled vocabularies of several of these languages in the 18th and 19th centuries, but the language samples are too small to establish relationships between and among the languages.  (See Coahuiltecan languages)

Population

Over more than 300 years of Spanish colonial history, their explorers and missionary priests recorded the names of more than one thousand bands or ethnic groups. Band names and their composition doubtless changed frequently, and bands often identified by geographic features or locations.  Most of the bands apparently numbered between 100 and 500 people.  The total population of non-agricultural Indians, including the Coahuiltecan, in northeastern Mexico and neighboring Texas at the time of first contact with the Spanish has been estimated by two different scholars as 86,000 and 100,000.  Possibly 15,000 of these lived in the Rio Grande delta, the most densely populated area. In 1757 a small group of African blacks was also recorded as living in the delta, apparently refugees from slavery.

Smallpox and slavery decimated the Coahuiltecan in the Monterrey area by the mid-17th century.  Due to their remoteness from the major areas of Spanish expansion, the Coahuiltecan in Texas may have suffered less from introduced European diseases and slave raids than did the indigenous populations in northern Mexico. But, the diseases spread through contact among indigenous peoples with trading. After a Franciscan Roman Catholic Mission was established in 1718 at San Antonio, the indigenous population declined rapidly, especially from smallpox epidemics beginning in 1739.  Most groups disappeared before 1825, with their survivors absorbed by other indigenous and mestizo populations of Texas or Mexico.

Culture and subsistence

In the words of one scholar, Coahuiltecan culture represents "the culmination of more than 11,000 years of a way of life that had successfully adapted to the climate, resources of south Texas.”  The peoples shared the common traits of being non-agricultural and living in small autonomous bands, with no political unity above the level of the band and the family.  They were nomadic hunter-gatherers, carrying their few possessions on their backs as they moved from place to place to exploit sources of food that might be available only seasonally. At each campsite, they built small circular huts with frames of four bent poles, which they covered with woven mats.  They wore little clothing. At times, they came together in large groups of several bands and hundreds of people, but most of the time their encampments were small, consisting of a few huts and a few dozen people. Along the Rio Grande, the Coahuiltecan lived more sedentary lives, perhaps constructing more substantial dwellings and using palm fronds as a building material.

During times of need, they also subsisted on worms, lizards, ants, and undigested seeds collected from deer dung.  They ate much of their food raw, but used an open fire or a fire pit for cooking.  Most of their food came from plants. Pecans were an important food, gathered in the fall and stored for future use.  In summer, large numbers of people congregated at the vast thickets of prickly pear cactus south-east of San Antonio, where they feasted on the fruit and the pads and interacted socially with other bands.  They cooked the bulbs and root crowns of the maguey, sotol, and lechuguilla in pits, and ground mesquite beans to make flour.  Most of the Coahuiltecan seemed to have had a regular round of travels in their food gathering. The Payaya band near San Antonio had ten different summer campsites in an area 30 miles square.  Some of the Indians lived near the coast in winter. In the summer they would travel 85 miles (140 km) inland to exploit the prickly pear cactus thickets.  Fish were perhaps the principal source of protein for the bands living in the Rio Grande delta.

Little is known about the religion of the Coahuiltecan.  They came together in large numbers on occasion for all-night dances called mitotes. During these occasions, they ate peyote to achieve a trance-like state for the dancing. The meager resources of their homeland resulted in intense competition and frequent, although small-scale, warfare.

History 

In the early 1530s Álvar Núñez Cabeza de Vaca and his three companions, survivors of a failed Spanish expedition to Florida, were the first Europeans known to have lived among and passed through Coahuiltecan lands. In 1554, three Spanish vessels were wrecked on Padre Island. The survivors, perhaps one hundred people, attempted to walk southward to Spanish settlements in Mexico. All but one were killed by the Indians. In the early 1570s the Spaniard Luis de Carvajal y Cueva campaigned near the Rio Grande, ostensibly to punish the Indians for their 1554 attack on the shipwrecked sailors, more likely to capture slaves.

In 1580, Carvajal, governor of Nuevo Leon, and a gang of "renegades who acknowledged neither God nor King", began conducting regular slave raids to capture Coahuiltecan along the Rio Grande. The Coahuiltecan were not defenseless. They often raided Spanish settlements, and they drove the Spanish out of Nuevo Leon in 1587. But they lacked the organization and political unity to mount an effective defense when a larger number of Spanish settlers returned in 1596. Conflicts between the Coahuiltecan peoples and the Spaniards continued throughout the 17th century. The Spanish replaced slavery by forcing the Indians to move into the encomienda system. Although this was exploitative, it was less destructive to Indian societies than slavery.

Smallpox and measles epidemics were frequent, resulting in numerous deaths among the Indians, as they had no acquired immunity. The first recorded epidemic in the region was 1636–39, and it was followed regularly by other epidemics every few years.  A 17th-century historian of Nuevo Leon, Juan Bautista Chapa, predicted that all Indian and tribes would soon be "annihilated" by disease; he listed 161 bands that had once lived near Monterrey but had disappeared.

Spanish expeditions continued to find large settlements of Coahuiltecan in the Rio Grande delta and large-multi-tribal encampments along the rivers of southern Texas, especially near San Antonio. The Spanish established Mission San Antonio de Valero (the Alamo) in 1718 to evangelize among the Coahuiltecan and other Indians of the region, especially the Jumano. They soon founded four additional missions.  The Coahuiltecan supported the missions to some extent, seeking protection with the Spanish from a new menace, Apache, Comanche, and Wichita raiders from the north.  The five missions had about 1,200 Coahuiltecan and other Indians in residence during their most prosperous period from 1720 until 1772. That the Indians were often dissatisfied with their life at the missions was shown by frequent "runaways" and desertions.

Spanish settlement of the lower Rio Grande Valley and delta, the remaining demographic stronghold of the Coahuiltecan, began in 1748.  The Spanish identified fourteen different bands living in the delta in 1757.  Overwhelmed in numbers by Spanish settlers, most of the Coahuiltecan were absorbed by the Spanish and mestizo people within a few decades.

After a long decline, the missions near San Antonio were secularized in 1824. The Coahuiltecan appeared to be extinct as a people, integrated into the Spanish-speaking mestizo community. In 1827 only four property owners in San Antonio were listed in the census as "Indians." A man identified as a "Mission Indian," probably a Coahuiltecan, fought on the Texan side in the Texas Revolution in 1836.

In the community of Berg's Mill, near the former San Juan Capistrano Mission, a few families retained memories and elements of their Coahuiltecan heritage. In the late 20th century, they united in public opposition to excavation of Indian remains buried in the graveyard of the former Mission. Archeologists conducted investigations at the mission in order to prepare for projects to preserve the buildings. In the words of scholar Alston V. Thoms, they “became readily visible as resurgent Coahuiltecans.”

Heritage groups 
Several unrecognized organizations in Texas claim to be descendants of Coahuitecan people. These organizations are neither federally recognized  or state-recognized as Native American tribes.

References

External links

 Reassessing Cultural Extinction: Change and Survival at Mission San Juan Capistrano, Texas
 
 
Tāp Pīlam Coahuiltecan Nation

Extinct Native American peoples
Native American tribes in Texas
Indigenous peoples in Mexico
Indigenous peoples of Aridoamerica